Najeebullah Khan Niazi (3 October 1967 – 4 October 2014) was a Pakistani politician who was a Member of the Provincial Assembly of the Punjab, from 1997 to 1999 and again from 2013 until his death.

Early life
He was born on 3 October 1964 in Mianwali.He took his degree in Masters in Political sciences. In his school he was known as an avid debater

Political career
Najeebullah Khan Niazi was a famous for his bravery and for his support to people of Bhakkar. People in Bhakkar always talk about his charismatic personality.
He was elected to the Provincial Assembly of the Punjab in 1997 Pakistani general election.

He was re-elected to the Provincial Assembly of the Punjab as an independent candidate from Constituency PP-48 (Bhakkar-II) in 2013 Pakistani general election. After his successful election, he joined Pakistan Muslim League (Nawaz) (PML-N).

Family
His wife's name is Dr. Shehzad Najeebullah Khan and he has four daughters; Kainat Khan, Eman Khan, Zoha khan and Malaika Khan. He was a paternal cousin of Imran Khan and was a member of the Imran Khan family along with his brother Inamullah Niazi. His other brother Hafeez Ullah Niazi is journalist and columnist at The Jang Group.

References

1967 births
2014 deaths
Punjab MPAs 1997–1999
Punjab MPAs 2013–2018
Pakistan Muslim League (N) MPAs (Punjab)
People from Mianwali District
Niazi family